The MTV European Music Awards for the best UK & Ireland act has been a regional category since 1998 and have been won by 15 different acts

The last Irish winners to win in this category was Westlife in 2000. In 2003 The Irish band, The Thrills were the last Irish nominees in the Category, although the category is still called "Best UK & Ireland Act". British boy band One Direction which includes an Irish member, Niall Horan won the Awards in 2012, 2013 & 2014. British girl group Little Mix, are currently the most awarded and nominated act and female group in this category, winning a of total six times out of seven nominations.

The following is a list of the MTV Europe Music Award winners and nominees for Best UK & Ireland Act.

Winners and nominees
Winners are listed first and highlighted in bold.

† indicates the Wildcard–winning artist.

1990s

2000s

2010s

2020s

Notes
Local Hero Award — UK 
Local Hero Award — Ireland 
MTV Select — UK and Ireland
Best MTV2 UK Act
Best UK & Ireland New Act

Performers with multiple awards
6 awards
Little Mix (4 consecutive)

3 awards 
One Direction (consecutive)

2 awards
Coldplay
Muse

Performers with multiple nominations
7 nominations
Little Mix

5 nominations
Ed Sheeran

4 nominations
One Direction
Coldplay

3 nominations
Adele
Muse
Dua Lipa
Stormzy

2 nominations
Jessie J
Florence and the Machine
Ellie Goulding
Calvin Harris
Years & Years
Craig David
Gorillaz
Arctic Monkeys
Dave

See also 
 Best UK Video at MTV Video Music Awards
 Brit Awards

References

MTV Europe Music Awards
Irish music awards
British music awards
Awards established in 1999